Yairah Amit (born 19 October 1941 in Tel Aviv) is an Israeli biblical scholar. Amit studied at the Hebrew University of Jerusalem before doing a PhD at Tel Aviv University under the supervision of Meir Sternberg. She is currently Professor of Biblical Studies at Tel Aviv University. In 2012 a Festschrift was published in her honor. Words, Ideas, Worlds: Biblical Essays in Honour of Yairah Amit included contributions from Athalya Brenner, Cheryl Exum, and Yael Feldman.

Selected works
 The book of Judges : the art of editing, 1992
 Sefer Shofṭim : omanut ha-ʻarikhah, 1992
 Hidden polemics in biblical narrative, 1996
 History and ideology : an introduction to historiography in the Hebrew Bible, 1997
 Shofṭim : ʻim mavo u-ferush, 1999
 Reading biblical narratives : literary criticism and the Hebrew Bible, 2000
 Galui ṿe-nistar ba-Miḳra : pulmusim geluyim, ʻaḳifim uṿe-iḳar semuyim, 2003
 Essays on ancient Israel in its Near Eastern context : a tribute to Nadav Naʼaman, 2006
 In praise of editing in the Hebrew Bible : collected essays in retrospect, 2012

References

1941 births
Living people
Hebrew University of Jerusalem alumni
Israeli biblical scholars
Old Testament scholars
People from Tel Aviv
Tel Aviv University alumni
Academic staff of Tel Aviv University
Female biblical scholars